Rose Bernd is a 1957 German drama film directed by Wolfgang Staudte. It was adapted from the play of the same name by Gerhart Hauptmann and was entered into the 1957 Cannes Film Festival. It was shot at the Bavaria Studios in Munich. The film's sets were designed by the art directors Hans Berthel and Robert Stratil.

Cast
 Maria Schell as Rose Bernd
 Raf Vallone as Arthur Streckmann
 Käthe Gold as Henriette Flamm
 Leopold Biberti as Christoph Flamm
 Hannes Messemer as August Keil
 Arthur Wiesner as Vater Bernd
 Krista Keller as Maria Schubert
 Siegfried Lowitz as Judge
 Helmut Brasch

References

Bibliography
 Goble, Alan. The Complete Index to Literary Sources in Film. Walter de Gruyter, 1999.

External links

1957 films
1957 drama films
German drama films
West German films
1950s German-language films
Films based on works by Gerhart Hauptmann
Films directed by Wolfgang Staudte
German films based on plays
Bavaria Film films
Films shot at Bavaria Studios
1950s German films